State Road 559 (SR 559) is an  state highway located entirely in Polk County, Florida. It is accessible to Auburndale and Polk City. It straddles the shoreline of Lake Ariana and Lake Juliana.

Route description
SR 559 starts at Florida State Road 655 in Auburndale as Main Street at a grade-separated junction that crosses over both SR 655 and the CSX Auburndale Subdivision. The first major intersection is with U.S. Highway 92 (US 92). It heads northward through the downtown of the city, making three sharp turns around the Auburndale Chamber of Commerce and proceeding into a traffic circle around Lake Stella. The road makes its way to the eastern shore of Lake Ariana and straddles it for  before passing the subdivision of Ariana Harbors. Leaving Auburndale, the road runs along the northeastern shore of Lake Juliana and continues north and slightly west to intersect with Interstate 4 (I-4) at its exit 44. The road passes Fantasy of Flight, turns northwest, and ends at SR 33 in Polk City.

Major intersections

Related routes

Auburndale truck route

State Road 559 Truck is a truck detour mainly along Berkeley Road. It begins at the southern terminus of the northern segment of Polk County Road 655 at US 92, running in a  overlap with the county route. At the intersection of CR 559A (C. Fred Jones Boulevard), SR 559 Truck turns east, and runs along the entire county road until it reaches SR 559 south of exit 44 on Interstate 4.

References

External links

559
559